Dryobates is a genus of birds in the woodpecker family Picidae. The species are widely distributed and occur in both Eurasia and the Americas.

Taxonomy
The genus Dryobates was named by the German naturalist Friedrich Boie in 1826 with the downy woodpecker (Dryobates pubescens) as the type species.

The genus name Dryobates is from the Greek compound word δρυο-βάτης : 'woodland walker'; from  :  drus (genitive  : dryós) meaning woodland and  : -bátēs meaning walker. In the eBird/Clements Checklist of Birds of the World, the genus Dryobates is expanded to include all the species in Leuconotopicus and Veniliornis.

The genus contains the following species:

References

 
Bird genera